This is a list of current NCAA Division I FBS radio broadcasters for both football and men's basketball. Traditionally, a radio broadcaster announces every game, or almost every game, for the team they cover, earning the distinction of being called the "voice" of that team. Most major colleges, as noted below, use the same announcer to serve as the voice of both their football and men's basketball teams.

References 

Lists of college football broadcasters
Lists of college basketball announcers in the United States